The 2016–17 Boston Celtics season was the 71st season of the franchise in the National Basketball Association (NBA). The team obtained the No. 1 seed in the Eastern Conference for the first time since 2008 when they won the NBA title. At 53–29, they finished with the lowest winning percentage of a No. 1 seed since the Detroit Pistons in 2007.

In the playoffs, the Celtics defeated the Chicago Bulls in the First Round in six games, advancing to the Semifinals, where they then defeated the Washington Wizards in seven games, advancing to the Eastern Conference Finals, where they lost to the Cleveland Cavaliers in five games.

Isaiah Thomas was voted to play in the 2017 All-Star Game.

Following the season, Avery Bradley was traded to the Detroit Pistons, Kelly Olynyk signed with the Miami Heat, and both Isaiah Thomas and Jae Crowder were traded to the Cleveland Cavaliers, ending the Isaiah Thomas era in Boston in exchange for Kyrie Irving. Jaylen Brown was also added to the roster.

Draft picks

The Boston Celtics hold a modern-day league record with eight picks in the 2016 draft, the most picks held in a single draft since the NBA modified the draft to two rounds. Their top selection was acquired from the Brooklyn Nets this season due to them not only holding the third-worst record in the season, but also having it as part of their payment for trading  Kevin Garnett and Paul Pierce in 2013. Their middle first round selection, meanwhile, was acquired from the Dallas Mavericks in the 2014 trade that saw Rajon Rondo and Dwight Powell shipped out of Boston. The last first round selection they held was their own. Meanwhile, every second round selection for the Celtics that year was acquired via trade while their own second round selection (which would have been Pick 52 this year) was traded away to the Utah Jazz.

For the first round of the draft, the Celtics drafted Jaylen Brown from the University of California, Guerschon Yabusele from France, and Ante Žižić from Croatia. In the second round, however, Boston took the surprise lottery-level talent that was last remaining in the draft with Deyonta Davis from Michigan State University, Rade Zagorac from Serbia, Demetrius Jackson (a guy who was also a considerable first round level talent) from the University of Notre Dame, the first ever Ghanaian taken for an NBA draft in Ben Bentil (another player that was considered as a potential first round talent, although he was more projected to be late in the first round himself) from Providence College, and the Egyptian Abdel Nader from Iowa State University. Deyonta Davis and Rade Zagorac would be the only players whose draft rights would be traded the night of the draft, as they would be going to the Memphis Grizzlies on draft night for a 2018 second round selection. Meanwhile, both Guerschon Yabusele and Ante Žižić would continue to remain overseas in China and Croatia respectively for one more season, with the rest of the players signing contracts with the team, save for Ben Bentil and Abdel Nader, with the latter heading off to the Maine Red Claws and the former travelling to the Fort Wayne Mad Ants (three different times) and the Xinjiang Flying Tigers in China before being a part of the Dallas Mavericks later on in the season.

Game log

Preseason 

|- style="background:#fbb
| 1 
| October 4
| @ Philadelphia
| 
| Terry Rozier (12)
| Al Horford (8)
| Avery Bradley (6)
| Mullins Center9,400
| 0–1
|- style="background:#bfb
| 2
| October 6
| @ Charlotte
| 
| Isaiah Thomas (15)
| Al Horford (8)
| Bradley, Thomas (5)
| Greensboro Coliseum8,021
| 1–1
|- style="background:#bfb
| 3 
| October 8
| Charlotte
| 
| Jordan Mickey (16)
| Jordan Mickey (6)
| Hunter, Smart (5)
| Mohegan Sun Arena8,052
| 2–1
|- style="background:#bfb
| 4 
| October 13
| @ Brooklyn
| 
| Horford, Smart (13)
| Al Horford (9)
| Terry Rozier (7)
| Barclays Center11,043
| 3–1
|- style="background:#bfb
| 5 
| October 15
| @ New York
| 
| R. J. Hunter (17)
| Amir Johnson (6)
| Demetrius Jackson (6)
| Madison Square Garden19,607
| 4–1
|- style="background:#bfb
| 6 
| October 17
| Brooklyn
| 
| Isaiah Thomas (19)
| Jonas Jerebko (7)
| Green, Smart (4)
| TD Garden15,925
| 5–1
|- style="background:#fbb
| 7
| October 19
| New York
| 
| Jaylen Brown (17)
| Mickey, Young (7)
| Demetrius Jackson (4)
| TD Garden16,327
| 5–2

Standings

Division

Conference

Regular season 

|- style="background:#bfb"
| 1
| October 26
| Brooklyn
| 
| Isaiah Thomas (25) 
| Avery Bradley (9)
| Isaiah Thomas (9)
| TD Garden18,624
| 1–0
|- style="background:#fbb"
| 2
| October 27
| @ Chicago
| 
| Isaiah Thomas (25) 
| Al Horford (7)
| Bradley, Horford (5)
| United Center21,501
| 1–1
|- style="background:#bfb"
| 3
| October 29
| @ Charlotte
| 
| Avery Bradley (31)
| Avery Bradley (11)
| Isaiah Thomas (9)
| Spectrum Center18,708
| 2–1

|- style="background:#bfb"
| 4
| November 2
| Chicago
| 
| Amir Johnson (23)
| Amir Johnson (6)
| Isaiah Thomas (9)
| TD Garden18,624
| 3–1
|- style="background:#fbb"
| 5
| November 3
| @ Cleveland
| 
| Isaiah Thomas (30)
| Zeller, Bradley (10)
| Thomas, Zeller (9)
| Quicken Loans Arena20,562
| 3–2
|- style="background:#fbb"
| 6
| November 6
| Denver
| 
| Isaiah Thomas (30)
| Avery Bradley (11)
| Avery Bradley (6)
| TD Garden17,452
| 3–3
|- style="background:#fbb"
| 7
| November 9
| @ Washington
| 
| Isaiah Thomas (23)
| Thomas, Olynyk (6)
| Isaiah Thomas (10)
| Verizon Center12,675
| 3–4
|- style="background:#bfb"
| 8
| November 11
| New York
| 
| Isaiah Thomas (29)
| Avery Bradley (10)
| Marcus Smart (10)
| TD Garden18,624
| 4–4
|- style="background:#bfb"
| 9
| November 12
| @ Indiana
| 
| Isaiah Thomas (23)
| Amir Johnson (9)
| Bradley, Thomas (5)
| Bankers Life Fieldhouse17,923
| 5–4
|- style="background:#fbb"
| 10
| November 14
| @ New Orleans
| 
| Isaiah Thomas (37)
| Avery Bradley (10)
| Isaiah Thomas (7)
| Smoothie King Center15,001
| 5–5
|- style="background:#bfb"
| 11
| November 16
| Dallas
| 
| Isaiah Thomas (30)
| Avery Bradley (13)
| Isaiah Thomas (6)
| TD Garden18,624
| 6–5
|- style="background:#fbb"
| 12
| November 18
| Golden State
| 
| Avery Bradley (17)
| Avery Bradley (10)
| Terry Rozier (5)
| TD Garden18,624
| 6–6
|- style="background:#bfb"
| 13
| November 19
| @ Detroit
| 
| Al Horford (18)
| Al Horford (11)
| Isaiah Thomas (8)
| The Palace of Auburn Hills16,107
| 7–6
|- style="background:#bfb"
| 14
| November 21
| @ Minnesota
| 
| Isaiah Thomas (29)
| Horford, Smart (6)
| Horford, Smart (5)
| Target Center13,167
| 8–6
|- style="background:#bfb"
| 15
| November 23
| @ Brooklyn
| 
| Isaiah Thomas (23)
| Amir Johnson (9)
| Al Horford (8)
| Barclays Center16,210
| 9–6
|- style="background:#fbb"
| 16
| November 25
| San Antonio
| 
| Isaiah Thomas (24)
| Al Horford (10)
| Marcus Smart (10)
| TD Garden18,624
| 9–7
|- style="background:#bfb"
| 17
| November 28
| @ Miami
| 
| Isaiah Thomas (25)
| Tyler Zeller (7)
| Isaiah Thomas (8)
| American Airlines Arena19,600
| 10–7
|- style="background:#fbb"
| 18
| November 30
| Detroit
| 
| Isaiah Thomas (25)
| Avery Bradley (10)
| Terry Rozier (6) 
| TD Garden17,338
| 10–8

|- style="background:#bfb"
| 19
| December 2
| Sacramento
| 
| Al Horford (26)
| Bradley, Jerebko (9)
| Isaiah Thomas (7)
| TD Garden18,624
| 11−8
|- style="background:#bfb"
| 20
| December 3
| @ Philadelphia
| 
| Isaiah Thomas (37)
| Avery Bradley (9)
| Isaiah Thomas (7)
| Wells Fargo Center17,063
| 12–8
|- style="background:#fbb;"
| 21
| December 5
| @ Houston
|  
| Al Horford (21)
| Avery Bradley (10)
| Al Horford (9)
| Toyota Center15,730
| 12–9
|- style="background:#bfb;"
| 22
| December 7
| @ Orlando
| 
| Avery Bradley (23)
| Jae Crowder (10)
| Al Horford (8)
| Amway Center17,009
| 13–9
|- style="background:#fbb;"
| 23
| December 9
| Toronto
| 
| Bradley, Horford (19)
| Kelly Olynyk (9)
| Al Horford (6)
| TD Garden18,624
| 13–10
|- style="background:#fbb;"
| 24
| December 11
| @ Oklahoma City
| 
| Al Horford (19)
| Amir Johnson (8)
| Marcus Smart (9)
| Chesapeake Energy Arena18,203
| 13–11
|- style="background:#fbb"
| 25
| December 14
| @ San Antonio
| 
| Avery Bradley (25)
| Avery Bradley (10)
| Bradley, Smart (9)
| AT&T Center18,418
| 13–12
|-style="background:#bfb"
| 26
| December 16
| Charlotte
| 
| Isaiah Thomas (26)
| Al Horford (8)
| Horford, Smart, Thomas (5)
| TD Garden18,624
| 14–12
|- style="background:#bfb"
| 27
| December 18
| @ Miami
| 
| Isaiah Thomas (23)
| Al Horford (7)
| Al Horford (8)
| American Airlines Arena19,600
| 15–12
|- style="background:#bfb;"
| 28
| December 20
| @ Memphis
| 
| Isaiah Thomas (44)
| Al Horford (14)
| Isaiah Thomas (6)
| FedExForum16,519
| 16–12
|- style="background:#bfb;"
| 29
| December 22
| @ Indiana
| 
| Isaiah Thomas (28)
| Al Horford (11)
| Isaiah Thomas (9)
| Bankers Life Fieldhouse17,577
| 17–12
|-style="background:#fbb;"
| 30
| December 23
| Oklahoma City
| 
| Isaiah Thomas (34)
| Johnson, Bradley, Horford, Jerebko (6)
| Isaiah Thomas (10)
| TD Garden18,624
| 17–13
|-style="background:#bfb;"
| 31
| December 25
| @ New York
| 
| Isaiah Thomas (27)
| Al Horford (7)
| Marcus Smart (7)
| Madison Square Garden19,812
| 18–13
|-style="background:#bfb;"
| 32
| December 27
| Memphis
| 
| Avery Bradley (23)
| Amir Johnson (10)
| Isaiah Thomas (7)
| TD Garden18,624
| 19–13
|- style= "background:#fbb;"
| 33
| December 29
| @ Cleveland
| 
| Isaiah Thomas (31)
| Jonas Jerebko (7)
| Isaiah Thomas (9)
| Quicken Loans Arena 20,562
| 19–14
|- style= "background:#bfb;"
| 34
| December 30
| Miami
| 
| Isaiah Thomas (52)
| Al Horford (6)
| Marcus Smart (6)
| TD Garden 18,624
| 20–14

|- style="background:#bfb;"
| 35
| January 3
| Utah
| 
| Isaiah Thomas (29)
| Kelly Olynyk (7)
| Isaiah Thomas (15)
| TD Garden18,624
| 21–14
|- style="background:#bfb;"
| 36
| January 6
| Philadelphia
| 
| Avery Bradley (26)
| Al Horford (12)
| Marcus Smart (8)
| TD Garden18,624
| 22–14
|- style="background:#bfb;"
| 37
| January 7
| New Orleans
| 
| Isaiah Thomas (38)
| Al Horford (7)
| Al Horford (8)
| TD Garden18,624
| 23–14
|- style="background:#fbb;"
| 38
| January 10
| @ Toronto
| 
| Isaiah Thomas (27)
| Al Horford (9)
| Isaiah Thomas (7)
| Air Canada Centre19,800
| 23–15
|- style="background:#bfb;"
| 39
| January 11
| Washington
| 
| Isaiah Thomas (38)
| Al Horford (9)
| Isaiah Thomas (5)
| TD Garden18,624
| 24–15
|- style="background:#bfb;"
| 40
| January 13
| @ Atlanta
| 
| Isaiah Thomas (28)
| Jae Crowder (9)
| Isaiah Thomas (9)
| Philips Arena18,216
| 25–15
|-style="background:#bfb;"
| 41
| January 16
| Charlotte
| 
| Isaiah Thomas (35)
| Kelly Olynyk (9)
| Horford, Olynyk, Smart, Thomas (4)
| TD Garden18,624
| 26–15
|-style="background:#fbb;"
| 42
| January 18
| New York
| 
| Isaiah Thomas (39)
| Horford, Johnson (7)
| Al Horford (10)
| TD Garden18,624
| 26–16
|- style="background:#fbb;"
| 43
| January 21
| Portland
| 
| Isaiah Thomas (41)
| Al Horford (9)
| Smart, Thomas (6)
| TD Garden18,624
| 26–17
|- style="background:#fbb;"
| 44
| January 24
| @ Washington
| 
| Isaiah Thomas (25)
| Jae Crowder (6)
| Isaiah Thomas (13)
| Verizon Center16,387
| 26–18
|- style="background:#bfb;"
| 45
| January 25
| Houston
| 
| Isaiah Thomas (38)
| Jae Crowder (10)
| Horford, Thomas (9)
| TD Garden18,624
| 27–18
|- style="background:#bfb;"
| 46
| January 27
| Orlando
| 
| Isaiah Thomas (21)
| Jonas Jerebko (8)
| Marcus Smart (11)
| TD Garden18,624
| 28–18
|- style="background:#bfb;"
| 47
| January 28
| @ Milwaukee
| 
| Isaiah Thomas (37)
| Johnson, Olynyk (7)
| Isaiah Thomas (8)
| Bradley Center18,717
| 29–18
|- style="background:#bfb;"
| 48
| January 30
| Detroit
|  
| Isaiah Thomas (41)
| Jonas Jerebko (10)
| Isaiah Thomas (8)
| TD Garden18,188
| 30–18

|- style="background:#bfb;"
| 49
| February 1
| Toronto
| 
| Isaiah Thomas (44)
| Jae Crowder (8)
| Isaiah Thomas (7)
| TD Garden18,624
| 31–18
|- style=background:#bfb;"
| 50
| February 3
| L.A. Lakers
| 
| Isaiah Thomas (38)
| Kelly Olynyk (9)
| Al Horford (8)
| TD Garden16,433
| 32–18
|- style=background:#bfb;"
| 51
| February 5
| L.A. Clippers
| 
| Isaiah Thomas (28)
| Al Horford (15)
| Isaiah Thomas (8)
| TD Garden18,624
| 33–18
|- style=background:#fbb;"
| 52
| February 8
| @ Sacramento
| 
| Isaiah Thomas (26)
| Kelly Olynyk (8)
| Isaiah Thomas (7)
| Golden 1 Center17,608
| 33–19
|- style="background:#bfb;"
| 53
| February 9
| @ Portland
| 
| Isaiah Thomas (34)
| Olynyk, Brown (8)
| Rozier, Smart (5)
| Moda Center19,393
| 34–19
|- style="background:#bfb;"
| 54
| February 11
| @ Utah
| 
| Isaiah Thomas (29)
| Al Horford (9)
| Thomas, Smart (5)
| Vivint Smart Home Arena19,911
| 35–19
|- style="background:#bfb;"
| 55
| February 13
| @ Dallas
| 
| Isaiah Thomas (29)
| Olynyk, Johnson (7)
| Isaiah Thomas (8)
| American Airlines Center20,159
| 36–19 
|- style="background:#bfb;"
| 56
| February 15
| Philadelphia
| 
| Isaiah Thomas (33)
| Kelly Olynyk (7)
| Marcus Smart (5)
| TD Garden18,624
| 37–19
|- style= "background:#fbb;"
| 57
| February 16
| @ Chicago
| 
| Isaiah Thomas (29)
| Kelly Olynyk (7)
| Isaiah Thomas (7)
| United Center 21,866
| 37–20
|- align="center"
| colspan="9" style="background:#bbcaff;" | All-Star Break
|- style= "background:#fbb;"
| 58
| February 24
| @ Toronto
| 
| Isaiah Thomas (20)
| Amir Johnson (6)
| Isaiah Thomas (5)
| Air Canada Centre 19,800
| 37–21  
|- |- style="background:#bfb;"
| 59
| February 26
| @ Detroit
| 
| Isaiah Thomas (33)
| Jae Crowder (11)
| Crowder, Horford  (5)
| Palace of Auburn Hills 16,107
| 38–21
|- style= "background:#fbb;"
| 60
| February 27
| Atlanta
| 
| Isaiah Thomas (19)
| Isaiah Thomas (7)
| Isaiah Thomas (7)
| TD Garden 18,624
| 38–22

|- style= "background:#bfb;"
| 61
| March 1
| Cleveland
| 
| Isaiah Thomas (31)
| Crowder, Horford (10)
| Al Horford  (10)
| TD Garden 18,624
| 39–22
|- style="background:#bfb;"
| 62
| March 3
| @ L. A. Lakers
| 
| Isaiah Thomas (18)
| Jaylen Brown (8)
| Isaiah Thomas (8)
| Staples Center18,997
| 40–22
|- style="background:#fbb;"
| 63 
| March 5
| @ Phoenix
| 
| Isaiah Thomas (35)
| Jae Crowder (10)
| Isaiah Thomas (5)
| Talking Stick Resort Arena16,790
| 40–23
|- style="background:#fbb;"
| 64
| March 6
| @ L. A. Clippers
| 
| Isaiah Thomas (32)
| Jae Crowder (8)
| Isaiah Thomas (5)
| Staples Center19,283
| 40–24
|- style="background:#bfb;"
| 65
| March 8
| @ Golden State
| 
| Isaiah Thomas (25)
| Jae Crowder (10)
| Al Horford (6)
| Oracle Arena19,596
| 41–24
|- style="background:#fbb;"
| 66
| March 10
| @ Denver
| 
| Isaiah Thomas (21)
| Marcus Smart (7)
| Isaiah Thomas (5)
| Pepsi Center17,147
| 41–25
|- style="background:#bfb;"
| 67 
| March 12
| Chicago
| 
| Isaiah Thomas (22)
| Jae Crowder (10)
| Al Horford (6)
| TD Garden18,624
| 42–25
|- style="background:#bfb;"
| 68 
| March 15
| Minnesota
| 
| Isaiah Thomas (27)
| Al Horford (9)
| Al Horford (8)
| TD Garden18,624
| 43–25
|- style="background:#bfb;"
| 69
| March 17
| @ Brooklyn
| 
| Jae Crowder (24)
| Jae Crowder (12)
| Marcus Smart (5)
| Barclays Center16,210
| 44–25
|- style="background:#fbb;"
| 70
| March 19
| @ Philadelphia
| 
| Al Horford (27)
| Al Horford (8)
| Marcus Smart (8)
| Wells Fargo Center19,446
| 44–26
|- style="background:#bfb;"
| 71
| March 20
| Washington
| 
| Isaiah Thomas (25)
| Kelly Olynyk (11)
| Al Horford (5)
| TD Garden18,624
| 45–26
|- style="background:#bfb;"
| 72
| March 22
| Indiana
| 
| Isaiah Thomas (25)
| Horford, Olynyk (8)
| Al Horford (8)
| TD Garden18,624
| 46–26
|- style="background:#bfb;"
| 73 
| March 24
| Phoenix
| 
| Isaiah Thomas (34)
| Horford, Crowder (10)
| Isaiah Thomas (7)
| TD Garden18,624
| 47–26
|- style="background:#bfb;"
| 74
| March 26
| Miami
| 
| Isaiah Thomas (30)
| Al Horford (10)
| Marcus Smart (9)
| TD Garden18,624
| 48–26
|- style="background:#fbb;"
| 75
| March 29
| Milwaukee
| 
| Isaiah Thomas (32)
| Marcus Smart (11)
| Al Horford (6)
| TD Garden18,624
| 48–27
|- style="background:#bfb;"
| 76
| March 31
| Orlando
| 
| Isaiah Thomas (35)
| Al Horford (9)
| Isaiah Thomas (7)
| TD Garden18,624
| 49–27

|-style="background:#bfb;"
| 77
| April 2
| @ New York
| 
| Isaiah Thomas (19)
| Jonas Jerebko (9)
| Isaiah Thomas (6)
| Madison Square Garden19,812
| 50–27
|- style="background:#fbb;"
| 78
| April 5
| Cleveland
| 
| Isaiah Thomas (26)
| Bradley, Horford (7)
| Isaiah Thomas (6)
| TD Garden18,624
| 50–28
|-style="background:#fbb;"
| 79
| April 6
| @ Atlanta
| 
| Isaiah Thomas (35)
| Kelly Olynyk (8)
| Marcus Smart (7)
| Philips Arena18,688
| 50–29
|-style="background:#bfb;"
| 80
| April 8
| @ Charlotte
| 
| Isaiah Thomas (35)
| Kelly Olynyk (11)
| Al Horford (7)
| Spectrum Center19,407
| 51–29
|- style="background:#bfb;"
| 81
| April 10
| Brooklyn
| 
| Isaiah Thomas (27)
| Crowder, Horford, Jerebko (8)
| Crowder, Smart (6)
| TD Garden18,624
| 52–29
|- style="background:#bfb;"
| 82
| April 12
| Milwaukee
| 
| Gerald Green (18)
| Green, Horford (6)
| Smart, Thomas (8)
| TD Garden18,624
| 53–29

Roster

<noinclude>

Playoffs

|- style="background:#fbb;"
| 1
| April 16 
| Chicago
| 
| Isaiah Thomas (33)
| Jae Crowder (8)
| Al Horford (8)
| TD Garden18,624
| 0–1
|- style="background:#fbb;"
| 2
| April 18
| Chicago
| 
| Isaiah Thomas (20)
| Al Horford (11)
| Kelly Olynyk (7)
| TD Garden18,624
| 0–2
|- style="background:#bfb;"
| 3
| April 21
| @ Chicago
| 
| Al Horford (18)
| Al Horford (8)
| Isaiah Thomas (9)
| United Center21,293
| 1–2
|- style="background:#bfb;"
| 4
| April 23
| @ Chicago
| 
| Isaiah Thomas (33)
| Al Horford (12)
| Isaiah Thomas (7)
| United Center21,863
| 2–2
|- style="background:#bfb;"
| 5
| April 26
| Chicago
| 
| Bradley, Thomas (24)
| Al Horford (7)
| Al Horford (9)
| TD Garden18,624
| 3–2
|- style="background:#bfb;"
| 6
| April 28
| @ Chicago
| 
| Avery Bradley (23)
| Horford, Olynyk (6)
| Al Horford (7)
| United Center21,682
| 4–2

|- style="background:#bfb;"
| 1
| April 30 
| Washington
| 
| Isaiah Thomas (33)
| Al Horford (9)
| Al Horford (10)
| TD Garden18,624
| 1–0
|- style="background:#bfb;"
| 2
| May 2
| Washington
| 
| Isaiah Thomas (53)
| Al Horford (12)
| Marcus Smart (5)
| TD Garden18,624
| 2–0
|- style="background:#fbb;"
| 3
| May 4
| @ Washington
| 
| Al Horford (16)
| Jae Crowder (7)
| Isaiah Thomas (4)
| Verizon Center20,356
| 2–1
|- style="background:#fbb;"
| 4
| May 7
| @ Washington
| 
| Isaiah Thomas (19)
| Crowder, Rozier (7)
| Marcus Smart (6)
| Verizon Center20,356
| 2–2
|- style="background:#bfb;"
| 5
| May 10
| Washington
| 
| Avery Bradley (29)
| Marcus Smart (11)
| Isaiah Thomas (9)
| TD Garden18,624
| 3–2
|- style="background:#fbb;"
| 6
| May 12
| @ Washington
| 
| Bradley, Thomas (27)
| Kelly Olynyk (8)
| Jae Crowder (8)
| Verizon Center20,356
| 3–3
|- style="background:#bfb;"
| 7
| May 15
| Washington
| 
| Isaiah Thomas (29)
| Horford, Smart (6)
| Isaiah Thomas (12)
| TD Garden18,624 
| 4–3

|- style="background:#fbb;"
| 1
| May 17
| Cleveland
| 
| Bradley, Crowder (21)
| Jaylen Brown (9)
| Isaiah Thomas (10)
| TD Garden18,624 
| 0–1
|- style="background:#fbb;"
| 2
| May 19
| Cleveland
| 
| Jaylen Brown (19)
| Horford, Mickey (6)
| Marcus Smart (7)
| TD Garden18,624 
| 0–2
|- style="background:#bfb;"
| 3
| May 21
| @ Cleveland
| 
| Marcus Smart (27)
| Jae Crowder (11)
| Marcus Smart (7)
| Quicken Loans Arena20,562
| 1–2
|- style="background:#fbb;"
| 4
| May 23
| @ Cleveland
| 
| Avery Bradley (19)
| Jae Crowder (8)
| Al Horford (7)
| Quicken Loans Arena20,562
| 1–3
|- style="background:#fbb;"
| 5
| May 25
| Cleveland
| 
| Avery Bradley (23)
| Jae Crowder (6)
| Terry Rozier (7)
| TD Garden18,624 
| 1–4

Transactions

Trades

Free agency

Re-signed

Additions

Subtractions

Awards

References

Boston Celtics seasons
Boston Celtics
Boston Celtics
Boston Celtics
Celtics
Celtics